Adam James Berkhoel (born May 16, 1981) is an American former professional ice hockey goaltender who played in the National Hockey League (NHL) with the Atlanta Thrashers. He was drafted 240th overall in the 2000 NHL Entry Draft by the Chicago Blackhawks.

Playing career
Prior to his professional career, Berkhoel attended Stillwater High School before he backstopped the University of Denver to the 2004 NCAA title, with a memorable 1–0 shutout of the University of Maine in the Championship game, including stopping a six-on-three skaters advantage for Maine in the final 90 seconds of the contest. The opposing goaltender in that game was Jimmy Howard. Howard and Berkhoel would later become teammates in Grand Rapids in 2007–08.

Berkhoel was originally drafted by the Chicago Blackhawks in 2000 but was eventually traded to the Atlanta Thrashers for future considerations. He played his first set of NHL games once the Thrashers ran into goaltending troubles in the 2005–06 season where he went 2–4–1 in seven full games while posting a .882 SV% and a 3.80 GAA along with one shutout. The Thrashers opted not to re-sign him, and Berkhoel signed with the Buffalo Sabres during the offseason preceding the 2006–07 season.

On July 16, 2007, Berkhoel was signed as a free agent by the Detroit Red Wings to play for their affiliate the Grand Rapids Griffins of the AHL. On August 15, 2008, Berkhoel signed a two-year contract with the Pittsburgh Penguins' AHL affiliate, the Wilkes-Barre/Scranton Penguins. After the conclusion of his deal with the Penguins, Berkhoel announced his retirement from professional hockey.

Career statistics

Awards and honors

References

External links
 

1981 births
Living people
American men's ice hockey goaltenders
Atlanta Thrashers players
Chicago Blackhawks draft picks
Chicago Wolves players
Dayton Bombers players
Denver Pioneers men's ice hockey players
Grand Rapids Griffins players
Gwinnett Gladiators players
Ice hockey players from Minnesota
NCAA men's ice hockey national champions
People from Woodbury, Minnesota
Rochester Americans players
Twin City Vulcans players
Wheeling Nailers players
Wilkes-Barre/Scranton Penguins players